Cotiujenii Mari is a commune in Șoldănești District, Moldova. It is composed of three villages: Cotiujenii Mari, Cușelăuca and Cobîlea station.

Notable people
 Nicolae Andronic, politician
 Ion Cazacliu 
 Grigore Cazacliu 
 Vladimir Cazacliu 
 Simeon G. Murafa (1887-1917), jurist, journalist, and politician. 
 Anatolie Popa
 Aurelian Silvestru 
 Gheorghe Urschi (born 1948)

References

Communes of Șoldănești District
Soroksky Uyezd
Soroca County (Romania)